Helene Schlanzowsky-Grekowska (1813 – 1897), was a Polish-Austrian ballet dancer.

She was engaged in the Ballet at the Theater am Kärntnertor between 1831 and 1836. She was the first Polish ballerina to have an famed international career.

References 

 Źródło: Słownik Biograficzny Teatru Polskiego 1765-1965, PWN Warszawa 1973

1813 births
19th-century Polish ballet dancers
1897 deaths